Alexander Eli Morand (born 1997), known professionally as Smiley (formerly Smiley_61st), is a Canadian rapper. He is currently signed to fellow rapper Drake's record label OVO Sound and Warner Records. He is known for his 2021 song Over the Top, a collaboration with his label boss Drake which peaked at number 57 on the Billboard Hot 100.

Career 
Smiley began rapping in 2014 with rap crew Garden Gang  after seeing his friends freestyling. In 2015, he released his track "9 on Me" which captured the attention of record producer Boi-1da. His track "Garden Girl" also helped him gain traction. He first interacted with Drake in 2017. In 2018 he released his debut project Bye or Bye. Also in 2018, Drake cited Smiley's lyrics during his first public statement following the release of diss track The Story of Adidon by American rapper Pusha T. In July 2021, he released Over the Top, collaboration with Drake produced by American record producer Tay Keith. In November 2021, he released his album Buy or Bye 2, the sequel to his 2018 project with appearances from Yung Bleu, Duvy, Drake, Pressa and OhGeesy.

Musical style 
Jordan Darville, writing for The Fader, describes Smiley's style in the following manner: "Stark street bars rapped with a cadence that's light but fills the room with its presence, like a cloud of good weed."

Legal issues 
In 2015, Smiley was in jail for a gun-related charge.

References

External links 
 

Living people
21st-century Canadian rappers
Rappers from Toronto
OVO Sound artists
Trap musicians
1997 births